Ivy Branch is a stream in Monroe County in the U.S. state of Missouri.

Ivy Branch derives its name from a corruption of the surname of Anderson Ivie, the original owner of the site.

See also
List of rivers of Missouri

References

Rivers of Monroe County, Missouri
Rivers of Missouri